Harold Koplow (November 21, 1940 – November 4, 2004), an American computer scientist and one of the early developers of office automation equipment, was raised in Lynn, Massachusetts. When his father developed health problems, Koplow became a pharmacy technician at his father's store, Broadway Pharmacy. After graduating from Swampscott High School, he was accepted at both MIT and the Massachusetts College of Pharmacy and Health Sciences, and opted for the latter because he hadn't received a scholarship at MIT.

He married in 1962 after graduating from pharmacy school.  He then enrolled at Tufts University for a graduate degree in Physics. He briefly worked as a school teacher before joining Wang Laboratories, where he programmed calculators.  One of his programs permitted a Wang calculator to interface with an IBM Selectric typewriter, which could be used to calculate and print the paperwork for auto sales.  

Koplow's interface program was developed, in 1974, into the Wang 1200 Word Processor, an IBM Selectric-based text-storage device.  The operator of this machine typed text on a conventional IBM typewriter; when the Return key was pressed, the line of text was stored on a cassette tape.  One cassette held roughly 20 pages of text, and could be "played back" (e.g., the text retrieved) by printing the contents on continuous-form paper in the 1200  typewriter's "print" mode. The stored text could also be edited, using keys on a simple, six-key array.  Basic editing functions included Insert, Delete, Skip (character, line), and so on.  

The labor and cost savings of this device were immediate, and remarkable:  pages of text no longer had to be retyped to correct simple errors, and projects could be worked on, stored, and then retrieved for use later on.  The rudimentary Wang 1200 machine was the precursor of the Wang Office Information System (OIS), which revolutionized the way typing projects were performed in the American workplace. 

When Wang acquired Philip Hankins, Inc. (PHI), Koplow met Dave Moros, with whom he would later collaborate to create the Wang Word Processing System. This and other office automation products that were created in Koplow's department were among the most successful products in Wang's history.

Koplow left Wang in 1982 because of conflicts with Fred Wang. He lived briefly in California before moving to Gainesville, Florida where he lived until he died in 2004.

1940 births
2004 deaths
American computer businesspeople
People from Gainesville, Florida
People from Lynn, Massachusetts
MCPHS University alumni